Jen Lowe is an American data scientist and professor at New York University's Interactive Telecommunications Program (ITP). Lowe has also researched at Columbia University's Spatial Information Design Laboratory, as well as co-founding the School for Poetic Computation in New York. She is a member of the collective Deep Lab.

Lowe's work is primarily focused on human interactions with data technology, most notably her One Human Heartbeat project that visualizes Lowe's own heartbeat. Lowe currently lives in New York.

Notable work 

 One Human Heartbeat, a project in which Lowe visualized her heartbeat in semi- real time. The data was on a 24-hour delay to allow for data upload, but it played in real time. The piece was described as "hopeful."
 Wind Flow
Guayupia, a collaboration with Patricio González Vivo. The two created a map of their son's genealogy and heritage, flipping the typical direction of maps so South was at the top.
The Library Project, a collaboration between Laura Kurgan and the Spatial Information Design Lab, and visualization designers Annelie Berner and Derek Watkins.

Published work 

 The Book of Shaders
 Two-Component Horizontal Aerosol Motion Vectors in the Atmospheric Surface Layer from a Cross-Correlation Algorithm Applied to Scanning Elastic Backscatter Lidar Data
 Clearing Space

References 

American women scientists
Living people
Year of birth missing (living people)
21st-century American women